is a railway station in the city of Yaita, Tochigi, Japan, operated by the East Japan Railway Company (JR East).

Lines

Station layout
This station has one island platform and one side platform connected to the station building by a footbridge. However, platform 2 is not in regular operation. The station has a Midori no Madoguchi staffed ticket office.

Platforms

History
Yaita Station opened on 1 October 1886. With the privatization of JNR on 1 April 1987, the station came under the control of JR East.

Passenger statistics
In fiscal 2019, the station was used by an average of 2728 passengers daily (boarding passengers only).

Surrounding area
Yaita City Hall
YaitaPost Office

See also
 List of railway stations in Japan

References

External links

 JR East station information 

Railway stations in Tochigi Prefecture
Tōhoku Main Line
Utsunomiya Line
Railway stations in Japan opened in 1886
Yaita, Tochigi
Stations of East Japan Railway Company